Jaroslav Papoušek (19 February 1920 – 16 July 1996) was a Czech film director and screenwriter. He started as a sculptor, before writing screenplays with Miloš Forman and Ivan Passer. In 1968 he started directing his own screenplays.

Selected filmography

 Black Peter (1963) - screenwriter
 Intimate Lighting (1965) - screenwriter
 Loves of a Blonde (1965) - screenwriter
 The Firemen's Ball (1967) - screenwriter
 The Most Beautiful Age (1968) - director and screenwriter
 Behold Homolka (1969) - director and screenwriter
 Hogo Fogo Homolka (1970) - director and screenwriter
 Homolka and the Purse (1972) - director and screenwriter
 A Wife for Three Men (1979) - director and screenwriter

References

External links
 

1929 births
1995 deaths
Czech film directors
Czech screenwriters
Male screenwriters
20th-century screenwriters
People from Zakarpattia Oblast